Ziemetshausen is a municipality in the district of Günzburg in Bavaria in Germany.

Mayors
Anton Birle (CSU) is the mayor, he was elected in 2002. He is the successor of Anton Weber (Unabhängige Wählergemeinschaft). Birle was reelected in 2008 and 2014.

References

External links
Official site

Populated places in Günzburg (district)